The Chiesa della Madonna del Vallone is a Roman Catholic church or sanctuary located in a rural site in the frazione of Piedicolle in Acquacanina, province of Macerata, in the region of Marche, Italy. It is located within the Parco Nazionale dei Monti Sibillini.

History
This marian shrine was completed in 1747, likely at the site of a chapel or aedicule. The main altarpiece depicts the Madonna and Child. Documents recall a church at the site by 1624. The church also has paintings both from the 20th century and a Deposition attributed to Lorenzo Garbieri.

References

18th-century Roman Catholic church buildings in Italy
Acquacanina